Victor Strand (also known simply as Strand), is a fictional character in the television series Fear the Walking Dead portrayed by Colman Domingo. The character was created by Robert Kirkman, Dave Erickson and David Wiener.

During the first six seasons, Victor is seen as a complex character. Despite his villainous tendencies, he still remained a protagonist. However, his arc came full circle at end of season six and he serves as the main antagonist of season seven. Victor has been well received by fans and critics. Initially a member of the recurring cast, Domingo was upgraded to series regular after season one.

Character biography
Victor is a mysterious character who has acquired great personal wealth as immediately indicated by his suit and jewelry, He appears to already have some knowledge of the outbreak and how it manifests itself in humans. It is unknown how long he was imprisoned at the temporary hospital set up in Raynard Community College before Nick arrived. He is calm and does not panic when confronting the walkers, even when he was trapped at the end of a locked corridor as a herd approached. He appears to have adapted quickly to the new world, telling Nicholas Clark that the only way to survive a mad world is to embrace the madness. Victor has a good sense of judgement, quickly assessing that Nick is weak, yet believing that Nick has the skills to survive. Victor identifies Nick's heroin addiction as a precursor to the behavior necessary for survival. Additionally, Victor appears to have some elements of a sociopath.

Season 1

In a military cell, Strand bribes a guardsman to save a feverish Nick from being moved. Strand later recruits Nick for an escape plot. The group drives to the National Guard's headquarters to rescue Liza, Griselda, and Nick. Travis' group reach the holding cells and set the detainees free before reuniting with Nick, Liza, and Strand. They try to escape through the medical ward, where they discover Dr. Exner has euthanized all of the patients. Dr. Exner tells them of an escape route before presumably committing suicide. Before they can escape, the group encounters Adams, who shoots Ofelia in the arm. Enraged, Travis brutally beats Adams and leaves him for dead. Strand leads the group to his oceanside mansion, where he reveals to Nick that he owns a yacht which he plans to escape on, called the Abigail.

Season 2

The group evacuates to the Abigail as the military bombs Los Angeles, in an attempt to contain the outbreak. Out at sea, the group comes across another boat full of survivors, but Strand refuses to pick them up. Strand informs the group they are heading to San Diego. Alicia mans the radio, only to hear distress calls, and she strikes up a conversation with another seaborne survivor named Jack. Madison becomes concerned at how Strand refuses to sleep, and Daniel tells her he is suspicious of Strand's motives. Once they are far enough out to sea, the group holds a funeral for Liza and buries her at sea. Strand threatens to throw overboard anyone who disobeys him. The group docks on a nearby island to escape pursuit of the unknown ship. They soon have to leave because George poisoned his entire family as part of a suicide pact, and the group are forced to leave the remainder of George's family behind on the island. With the news that San Diego has been burned down, it is revealed that Strand intended to go to Mexico the entire time. On the way to Mexico the boat's cooling system is clogged up and Strand orders Travis to fix it. They meet a woman named Alex and a boy who is badly burned. They agree to be towed behind the boat, but in the middle of the night Strand cuts the rope. When some bandits take the Abigail they capture the group, but Strand tries to raft, but the raft is shot while escaping and begins to sink slowly. After being saved and after reuniting with his partner; Luis, Strand felt indebted to Madison for rescuing him from an inevitable death and supporting the woman when she decided to make a trade with the bandits who had stolen the ship to get Travis and Alicia back. Additionally, Victor was confronted by Madison for sending Nick to look for his partner and barred from using him again on one of his errands. Strand arranges to pay the Mexican military for safe passage, but a shooting ensues that leaves two officers and Luis, Strand's contact, dead, Strand discovers that Thomas has been bitten and is dying and he decides to end his suffering. After killing Thomas, Celia is furious and demands that Strand and the group leave, shortly after Nick brings her Luis, Celia's walking son and so he lets the group stay, but Strand must go, when Daniel sets fire the mansion, Strand helps the rest of the group escape the fire.

Moments after the fire, Strand flees with Alicia, Madison and Ofelia to Abigail but they discover that the Abigail has been stolen, shortly after the group manages to settle in a Hotel in search of supplies, meanwhile, Madison and Strand get drunk at the bar while they express their various frustrations with life. However, a large horde of infected attack the hotel, trapping the four of them in. Using the technique of covering themselves with walker blood, Victor and Madison managed to pass unnoticed among the undead and managed to escape unscathed from the hotel. After discovering that the van in which they had traveled had disappeared, Strand quickly deduced that Ofelia or Alicia had been responsible and then the duo had no choice but to take refuge in the hotel again. Hearing the noises of someone calling for help, Victor and Madison managed to save Alicia, Elena and Hector from a group of infected just in time. Strand and Madison meet Oscar, the leader of the hotel's survivors and negotiate a truce with the. Madison, Strand, Alicia and other survivors begin the job of cleaning the hotel of the infected, the plan is successful and the survivors celebrate. Strand then goes to speak privately with Oscar, who is still mourning the death of his wife. Strand comforts Oscar and convinces him to finally let his wife go. Oscar gives Strand the key to the hotel room where his infected wife is imprisoned and Strand walks in to finish her off, immediately after which Strand is stabbed by Ilene, the mother of Oscar's wife, wounding him. It did not turn out to be serious but requires medical treatment. After recovering from his injuries, Madison informs Strand that Brandon and Derek are in the parking lot and that she suspects Chris is dead. Strand discourages her from telling Travis, as it would destroy the only thing keeping him going. It's the same hope Strand lost when Thomas died. Madison agrees that the news about Chris would break Travis. After Travis beats Brandon and Derek to death, Madison insists that they should leave the hotel with him, but Strand refuses to have anything to do with the plan. Later, after the residents attempt to kill Travis when Oscar Diaz dies from his injuries, Alicia kills Andrés and Strand appears to help them and forces Hector and the residents to leave Madison, Alicia, and Travis alone at gunpoint. Strand helps the three escape, but insisted on staying at the hotel.

Season 3

Season 4

Season 5

Season 6

Season 7

Development and reception
Domingo made his debut in the first-season episode "Cobalt". For the second season, Domingo was promoted to a series regular, and would later become a prominent character. Matt Fowler for IGN described him as a weird, suited "Randall Flagg" type character.

Domingo's performance was praised in the episode "Blood in the Streets". Matt Fowler of IGN stated that the best part of "Blood in the Streets," which was the exploration of Strand's backstory. Or at least, via flashbacks, important notable moments that helped explain Strand's wealth, yacht, and passage to Mexico. Along with a couple of character layers that helped round the guy out as something more than a direct, coarse, logic-monster.

References

Characters created by Robert Kirkman
Fear the Walking Dead
Fictional characters from California
Television characters introduced in 2015
Fictional gay males
Fictional LGBT characters in television
The Walking Dead (franchise) characters